Joseph Rukingi Reke (23 January 1892 – 3 November 1974) was a New Zealand rugby union and professional rugby league footballer who played representative rugby league (RL) for New Zealand.

Early life
Rukingi was born on 23 January 1892 to Wiri Rogers and Meretina Hamuera Pango.

Rugby union career
Reke played rugby union for New Zealand Māori under the name Joseph Rogers.

Playing career
Reke played for Rotorua and represented New Zealand in 1912 and on the 1913 tour of Australia. No tests were played in those years however, with matches instead against New South Wales and Queensland.

Personal life and death
Rukingi married Lenare Elizabeth Gordon on 7 October 1920. They had a son, Desmond Reke Rogers in 1928. Rukingi died on 3 November 1974, aged 82. His son Desmond died in 2005, after his wife, Lenare had died in 1980.

References

Bay of Plenty rugby league team players
Māori All Blacks players
New Zealand Māori rugby league players
New Zealand national rugby league team players
New Zealand rugby league players
New Zealand rugby union players